T Cars was a saloon car-based motor racing series based in the United Kingdom, open exclusively to drivers between the ages of 14 and 17. The series was set up in 1999 and was the first championship in the UK to allow drivers under the age of 16 to drive racing cars. The series was dropped in 2008, due to poor grid entries, and was finally replaced by the new Fiesta Junior Championship for the 2010 season.

Champions

References

Auto races in the United Kingdom
Auto racing series in the United Kingdom